Foxfire, also called fairy fire and chimpanzee fire, is the bioluminescence created by some species of fungi present in decaying wood. The bluish-green glow is attributed to a luciferase, an oxidative enzyme, which emits light as it reacts with a luciferin. The phenomenon has been known since ancient times, with its source determined in 1823.

Description 
Foxfire is the bioluminescence created by some species of fungi present in decaying wood. It occurs in a number of species, including Panellus stipticus, Omphalotus olearius and Omphalotus nidiformis. The bluish-green glow is attributed to luciferin, which emits light after oxidation catalyzed by the enzyme luciferase. Some believe that the light attracts insects to spread spores, or acts as a warning to hungry animals, like the bright colors exhibited by some poisonous or unpalatable animal species. Although generally very dim, in some cases foxfire is bright enough to read by.

History
The oldest recorded documentation of foxfire is from 382 B.C., by Aristotle, whose notes refer to a light that, unlike fire, was cold to the touch. The Roman thinker Pliny the Elder also mentioned glowing wood in olive groves.

Foxfire was used to illuminate the needles on the barometer and the compass of Turtle, an early submarine.  This is commonly thought to have been suggested by Benjamin Franklin; a reading of the correspondence from Benjamin Gale, however, shows that Benjamin Franklin was only consulted for alternative forms of lighting when the cold temperatures rendered the foxfire inactive.

After many more literary references to foxfire by early scientists and naturalists, its cause was discovered in 1823. The glow emitted from wooden support beams in mines was examined, and it was found that the luminescence came from fungal growth.

The "fox" in foxfire may derive from the Old French word , meaning "false", rather than from the name of the animal. The association of foxes with such fires is widespread, however, and occurs also in Japanese folklore.

See also
 Aurora Borealis, called "revontulet" (literally "foxfires") in the Finnish language
 List of bioluminescent fungi
 Will-o'-the-wisp

References

External links

 Foxfire: Bioluminescence in the Forest PDF file by Dr. Kim D. Coder, University of Georgia 8/99 
 Bioluminescent Fungi at Mykoweb

Bioluminescence
Bioluminescent fungi
Mycology